Mount Kain is a mountain located in the Fraser River Valley of Mount Robson Provincial Park, Canada. Mt. Kain was named during a survey of the Mt. Robson region conducted by the Alpine Club of Canada during the summer of 1911.  While surveying from a nearby peak, the party noticed the mountain and guide Conrad Kain exclaimed "Ach! That is my peak."  Trip leader Arthur Oliver Wheeler recorded  the peak as Mt. Kain.

References

External links
 

Two-thousanders of British Columbia
Canadian Rockies
Cariboo Land District